Camusnagaul  is a village on the south shore of the sea loch, Little Loch Broom in Wester Ross, Scottish Highlands and is in the Scottish council area of Highland.

NB There is also a Camusnagaul at the head of Loch Linnhe and opposite Fort William.

References

Populated places in Ross and Cromarty